Guangzong may refer to:

Guangzong County, in Hebei, China
Emperor Guangzong of Song (1147 – 1200), Chinese emperor of the Song Dynasty
Ming Guangzong, Taichang Emperor (1582 – 1620), Chinese emperor of the Ming Dynasty

Temple name disambiguation pages